Unplanned America is a gonzo television documentary series about three Australians, Pawel Jarecki, Tim 'Gonzo' Ryan and Nick Maher, who travel across America without a plan, other than to embark new adventures encountering as many unique individuals as possible. Driving an unreliable ’99 Camry with 300,000 kilometres on the odometer they hit the road to discover the real America. The trio placed their fate in the hands of the strangers they encountered along the way, in the hope of discovering a side of America that hadn’t been uncovered in backpacker travel guides.

History 
In 2012 Gonzo, Parv and Nick travelled to the States in the search of the most unique, challenging and inspiring societies that the "land of the free" had to offer. On a shoestring budget, funded by the three producers themselves, they travelled for six months throughout the USA, driving through more than 35 states and clocking up more than 20,000 miles. They filmed stories all over the country in places as varied as the mountains of Colorado, the Californian desert, Detroit’s urban wasteland, islands off the southern tip of Texas, the rainy city of Seattle, the mean streets of south Chicago and under the bright lights of NYC.

Episodes

Season One 2014

Season Two 2015
In six-part series two, Gonzo, Nick and Parv will find themselves in the infamous Portland Strip club scene, get their first marijuana license, eat a 20,000 calorie burger at the Heart Attack Grill in Las Vegas, get tattooed at the US’s most iconic tattoo shop, meet gangsters removing their tattoos
 and a whole lot more.

Music 
The vast majority of music featured in Unplanned America is that of unsigned, independent artists such as Ryan Egan.
As keen supporters of independent music No Roles For Sam reveled in the opportunity to provide exposure to a great deal of unsigned Australian, and in some case international, artists.

Theme Song 

The Unplanned America theme song is performed by Nick Nuisance & The Delinquents from Petersham in Sydney. The song is entitled 'Solar'.

References

External links
SBS's Unplanned America: From UFOs to the Insane Clown Posse, three Aussies try to navigate the weird from The Sydney Morning Herald, Entertainment
Unplanned America premieres on SBS 2 from If.com.au Intermedia

2014 Australian television series debuts
Australian non-fiction television series
Australian travel television series
Special Broadcasting Service original programming
English-language television shows